Radio Metrowave was the first private radio station in Bangladesh. The station carried a news and entertainment format that it characterised as "infotainment". It broadcast on frequency 256.41 meter band or 1170 kHz in medium wave, from 7:30a.m. to 10:30a.m. and noon to 3:00p.m. The station served the Dhaka metropolitan area and adjoining districts. It began broadcasting on 26 March 1999.

Programs
Its programs Probhati, Ajker Din, Ganer Pakhi, Metro Hits, Global Rhythm, Rockwave, Nakshi Katha, Metro Sananda, Sonali Otit and Station Rock were, according to the station, popular.

Shutdown
Radio Metrowave was closed down by the government on 27 June 2005 because of its persistent failure to pay off arrears to state-owned Bangladesh Betar, from which it rented a time slot and transmitter.

See also
 Communications in Bangladesh
 List of Bangladeshi television and radio channels

References

Radio stations in Bangladesh
Radio stations established in 1999
Radio stations disestablished in 2005
1999 establishments in Bangladesh
2005 disestablishments in Bangladesh
Defunct mass media in Bangladesh